Bavu is a 1923 silent American drama film directed by Stuart Paton, starring Wallace Beery in the title role, and written by Albert Kenyon and Raymond L. Schrock based upon a play by Earl Carroll. The film is a period piece involving Bolsheviks and the Russian Revolution.

Plot
According to the Motion Picture News:  A Russian revolutionist incites the peasantry to burn the city.  Mischka, a former servant in the nobelman's home, is commissioner of licenses under the new administration.  He loves the princess and in order to get her out of the country it is necessary to have the passport sealed with the revolutionist's ring. A fight follows, but Mischka escapes with the girl while Bavu drowns in the pursuit.

Cast
 Wallace Beery as Felix Bavu
 Estelle Taylor as Princess Annia
 Forrest Stanley as Mischka Vleck
 Sylvia Breamer as Olga Stropik
 Josef Swickard as Prince Markoff
 Nick De Ruiz as Kuroff
 Martha Mattox as Piplette
 Harry Carter as Shadow
 Jack Rollens as Michael Revno

Preservation
With no prints of Bavu found in any film archives, it is a lost film.

References

External links

1923 films
American silent feature films
Films directed by Stuart Paton
Lost American films
Universal Pictures films
1923 drama films
American black-and-white films
Silent American drama films
1923 lost films
Lost drama films
1920s American films